James Tillinghast Archer (May 15, 1819 – June 1, 1859) was an American lawyer and politician from the state of  Florida. Archer held a number of statewide offices.

Early life 
Archer was born on May 15, 1819 in Gillisonville, South Carolina. His family moved to Leon County in the Florida Territory in the 1830s as a result of his father, Hugh Archer, taking a position on the Florida Territorial Legislative Council. Archer was thus raised into Florida politics from an early age.

Political career 
In 1840, Archer was named U.S. Attorney for the Western District of Florida, though he would only hold the position for that year. A Democrat, he was named the first Florida Secretary of State when Florida gained its statehood in 1845. He served in this position until April 1848, when he was appointed as the third Florida Attorney General upon the resignation of incumbent Augustus Maxwell.

During his tenure, Archer was selected to be a member of the first Democratic National Committee at the 1848 Democratic National Convention. He would serve as Attorney General until his resignation in October 1848.

After his resignation, Archer began a private law practice in Tallahassee, Florida, partnering with local lawyer Hugh A. Corley to form the law firm Archer and Corley. Archer would later be briefly appointed as the fifth Florida Comptroller following the short absence of incumbent Theodore W. Brevard. He would serve from November 1854 until Brevard's return in January 1855.

Death and legacy 
Archer died in Tallahassee on June 1, 1859 from heart disease. He is buried in the Old City Cemetery in Tallahassee.

Shortly after his death, his friend David Levy Yulee named the town of Archer, Florida after him.

References

External links 

1819 births
1859 deaths
Florida Attorneys General
Secretaries of State of Florida
Florida Democrats
Florida Comptrollers
19th-century American politicians
People from Jasper County, South Carolina
People from Tallahassee, Florida